Blagoveshchensky District is the name of several administrative and municipal districts in Russia. The name is generally derived from or related to the root "blagovesheniye" (good news).
Blagoveshchensky District, Altai Krai, an administrative and municipal district of Altai Krai
Blagoveshchensky District, Amur Oblast, an administrative and municipal district of Amur Oblast
Blagoveshchensky District, Republic of Bashkortostan, an administrative and municipal district of the Republic of Bashkortostan

See also
Blagoveshchensky (disambiguation)
Blagoveshchensk (inhabited locality)
Blagoveshchenka

References